In total there are 317 listed buildings in the city of Southampton, of which 14 are Grade I, 20 are Grade II* and the remainder Grade II.

In England, a building or structure is defined as "listed" when it is placed on a statutory register of buildings of "special architectural or historic interest" by the Secretary of State for Culture, Media and Sport, a Government department, in accordance with the Planning (Listed Buildings and Conservation Areas) Act 1990. English Heritage, a non-departmental public body, acts as an agency of this department to administer the process and advise the department on relevant issues. There are three grades of listing status. The Grade II designation is the lowest, and is used for "nationally important buildings of special interest". Grade II* is used for "particularly important buildings of more than special interest", while Grade I (defined as being of "exceptional interest" and greater than national importance), is the highest of the three grades.

This list summarises 48 Grade II-listed buildings and structures whose names begin with C. Numbered buildings with no individual name are listed by the name of the street on which they stand.

Listed buildings

Notes
Location is given first as a grid reference, based on the British national grid reference system (or OSGB36) of the Ordnance Survey; and second  as World Geodetic System 84coordinates, used  by the Global Positioning System.
Unless otherwise stated, the descriptions are based on those on the Historic England database.
The Historic England database is the official listing and includes a description of the property, the reasons for designation, the date of listing  and an extract from the Ordnance Survey map at a scale of 1:2500 pinpointing the exact location of the building.
The British Listed Buildings database also includes the details of the property from the Historic England database, together with links to Google/street view, Ordnance Survey and Bing maps/birds eye view.

References

Sources
Southampton City Council: Historic Environment Record – Listed Buildings in Southampton
British Listed Buildings – Listed Buildings in Southampton

Lists of Grade II listed buildings in Hampshire
Lists of listed buildings in Southampton